This is a list of the longest losing streaks in National Hockey League (NHL) history. The list includes streaks that started at the end of one season and carried over into the following season. There are two lists, streaks that consist entirely of regular-season games and streaks made up of playoff games only. The 2003–04 Pittsburgh Penguins and 2020–21 Buffalo Sabres own the record for the longest losing streak in NHL history at 18 games.  The 1974–75 Washington Capitals and 1992–93 San Jose Sharks own the NHL record for the longest pointless streak at 17 games; the 2003–04 Penguins' losing streak included one overtime loss, and the 2020–21 Sabres’ losing streak included two overtime and one shootout loss. Since the 1999–2000 season, the NHL awards a team one point for an overtime loss, and since the 2005–06 season, a team also receives one point for a shootout loss.

The 1980–81 Winnipeg Jets own the longest winless streak in NHL history at 30 games. Winnipeg's streak included 23 losses and seven ties.

Only regular season losing streaks lasting fourteen or more games are included.

Starting with the 2005–06 season, tie games were abolished in favor of a shootout.

Key

Losing streaks

Regular season
This list contains only the top streaks consisting entirely of regular-season games.

Postseason
This is a list of streaks recorded only in the playoffs. The list only features losing streaks stretched through multiple seasons.

Winless streaks
This list includes teams who had the longest winless streaks in NHL history. The streaks include ties, and consists only of regular season games.

Pointless streaks
This list includes all teams with the longest losing streaks without recording a point in NHL history. Starting with the 1999–2000 season, a team also receives a point for an overtime loss or (since 2005) shootout loss. Thus, the only way for modern NHL teams to achieve this dubious record is if all of their losses come in regulation.

See also
 List of NHL records (team)
 List of National Hockey League longest winning streaks

Notes

References

External links
NHL Records
Hockey Reference

 

National Hockey League statistical records